Diguvamasapalle (Eguvamasapalli) is a village in Chittoor mandal in Chittoor district in the Indian state of Andhra Pradesh.  it had a population of 3835 in 883 households.

Geography
It is located approximately 10 kilometers from Chittoor town. It is also located near to Kanipakam (temple town of lord Ganesha) and Tiruthani (a place in Tamil Nadu famous for Lord Muruga temple which is located on hills).

Economy

This village is surrounded by mango groves and sugar cane fields. Cultivation and cattle farming are the main occupations of the inhabitants. Women in the village get benefit through Development of Women and Children in Rural Areas (DWCRA), a program initiated by the central government which helps them in receiving loans for their self-employment at less interest.

Education
This village has minimum facilities with primary health center, Veterinary Hospital and Primary school. Many people from this place are well educated working in different parts of the world.

Religion
In the middle of the village Lord Krishna's temple is located, which is a symbol of peace and devotion.

Transport
People travelling to this village can take town bus with number nine from old chittoor bus stand.

Notes and references

Villages in Chittoor district